White County Jail is a historic building in White County, Georgia. It was added to the National Register of Historic Places on September 13, 1985. It is located on Main Street. It may have been constructed in 1900.

It is a two-story brick building with plain Italianate design. It was built in 1901 at cost of $4,000, replacing the first jail of the county which was condemned in 1897.  Its first floor housed the jailer and family and prisoners were housed on the second floor.  It served until the county opened a new county jail in the late 1960s.  In 1985 it served as headquarters for the county's Department of Transportation.

See also
National Register of Historic Places listings in White County, Georgia

References

Buildings and structures in White County, Georgia
Jails in Georgia (U.S. state)